The 1952 All-Big Seven Conference football team consists of American football players chosen by various organizations for All-Big Seven Conference teams for the 1952 college football season.  The selectors for the 1952 season included the Associated Press (AP) and the United Press (UP).  The AP selected separate offensive and defensive teams in 1952; the UP selected a single 11-man team. Players selected as first-team honorees by both the AP and UP are displayed in bold.

All-Big Seven selections

Offense

Ends
 Max Boydston, Oklahoma (AP-1; UP-1)
 Paul Leoni, Kansas (AP-1; UP-1)

Tackles
 Oliver Spencer, Kansas (AP-1)
 Jim Davis, Oklahoma (AP-1)

Guards
 Jack Lordo, Missouri (AP-1)
 Clayton Curtis, Nebraska (AP-1)

Centers
 Tom Catlin, Oklahoma (AP-1; UP-1)

Backs
 Eddie Crowder, Oklahoma (AP-1; UP-1)
 Billy Vessels, Oklahoma (AP-1; UP-1) (1952 Heisman Trophy, College Football Hall of Fame)
 Charlie Hoag, Kansas (AP-1; UP-1)
 Buck McPhail, Oklahoma (AP-1; UP-1)

Defense

Ends
 Don Branby, Colorado (AP-1)
 Dennis Emanuel, Nebraska (AP-1)

Tackles
 Jerry Minnick, Nebraska (AP-1; UP-1)
 Ed Rowland, Oklahoma (AP-1; UP-1)

Guards
 Bob Hantla, Kansas (AP-1; UP-1)
 J. D. Roberts, Oklahoma (AP-1; UP-1) (College Football Hall of Fame)

Linebackers
 Tom Catlin, Oklahoma (AP-1; UP-1 [center])
 Galen Fiss, Kansas (AP-1)

Backs
 Gil Reich, Kansas (AP-1)
 Ed Merrifield, Missouri (AP-1)
 Veryl Switzer, Kansas State (AP-1 [S])

Key

See also
1952 College Football All-America Team

References

All-Big Seven Conference football team
All-Big Eight Conference football teams